Pablo Muñoz Crespo (born 4 September 2003) is a Spanish professional footballer who plays as a midfielder for Rayo Vallecano B.

Professional career
Muñoz is a youth product of Alcobendas, CD Chamartín Vergara and Rayo Vallecano. He gained national attention after scoring 19 goals with the U19s as a midfielder in the 2021-22 season. He was promoted to Rayo's reserves for the 2022-23 season.

On 20 May 2022, Muñoz signed his first professional contract with Rayo Vallecano. He made his first team – and professional – debut with Rayo as a late substitute in a 1–1 La Liga tie with Atlético Madrid on 18 October 2022.

References

External links
 
 
 

2003 births
Living people
People from San Sebastián de los Reyes
Spanish footballers
Spain youth international footballers
Association football midfielders
Rayo Vallecano players
Rayo Vallecano B players
La Liga players
Segunda Federación players